The Turkana Geothermal Power Station, is a  geothermal power station under development in Kenya.

Location
The power station would be located in the Suguta Valley, Turkana County, in the semi-arid north-western Kenya, immediately south of Lake Turkana.

Overview
Reconnaissance surveys by a team from the British Geological Survey indicated the occurrence of a hydro-thermal system in the project area.

Olsuswa Energy Limited, a locally registered company plans to develop this power station, starting with a 70 megawatt power station, which is expected to expand to 140 megawatts, over a five to eight year period. The electricity generated is expected to be interrelated into the national electricity grid.

In April 2018, Olsuswa Energy Limited signed a memorandum of understanding with the Turkana County government in the presence of the elected leaders of the community and the public. The development is expected to bring jobs and improved living standards of the residents.

Ownership
The owners of the project are Olsuswa Energy Limited, co-owned by Manga Mugwe, a Kenyan investor and politician. The project area covers an estimated .

Funding
The entire project is expected to cost US$420, spread out over a 5-8 year period. The owner/developers expect to raise the funds though equity and institutional loans. In November 2017, the African Union Commission granted US$980,000 towards the development of this power station.

See also

List of power stations in Kenya 
Energy in Kenya

References

External links
 Website of Olsuswa Energy Limited
 The Rise of East Africa As An Alternative Energy Mecca
 BVC Geothermal Project – Kenya

Geothermal power stations in Kenya
Power stations in Kenya